Jussi Petteri Jokinen (born April 1, 1983) is a Finnish former professional ice hockey forward. After playing in his native Finland with Oulun Kärpät of the Liiga he was drafted by the National Hockey League (NHL)'s Dallas Stars in 2001 in the sixth round, 192nd overall, and spent his first three NHL seasons with the team. Jokinen has also played in the NHL for the Tampa Bay Lightning, Carolina Hurricanes, Pittsburgh Penguins, Florida Panthers, Edmonton Oilers, Los Angeles Kings, Columbus Blue Jackets and Vancouver Canucks.

Jokinen is of no relation to former NHL player Olli Jokinen, but has a younger brother, Juho, who also plays hockey. During his NHL career, Jokinen was widely considered a shootout and faceoff specialist.

Playing career

Dallas Stars
Jokinen was drafted by the Dallas Stars in the sixth round, 192nd overall, at the 2001 NHL Entry Draft. He spent four seasons before his NHL debut playing for Oulun Kärpät of the SM-liiga, the top Finnish league.

In his rookie year in 2005–06, Jokinen gained a great reputation as a top shootout specialist in the NHL. Until being stopped by Vesa Toskala, he was a remarkable nine-for-nine in shootouts before his first unsuccessful attempt.

On November 16, 2007, Jokinen scored four goals against the Colorado Avalanche in a 6–1 win.

Tampa Bay Lightning and Carolina Hurricanes
At the NHL trade deadline, on February 26, 2008, Jokinen was traded to the Tampa Bay Lightning (along with Mike Smith, Jeff Halpern and a 2009 fourth-round draft pick) in exchange for Brad Richards and Johan Holmqvist. Jokinen finished with 16 goals and 42 points.

On February 4, 2009, Jokinen was placed on waivers by the Lightning and later, on February 7, 2009, was traded to the Carolina Hurricanes in exchange for Wade Brookbank, Josef Melichar and a 2009 fourth-round draft pick. During the 2009 Stanley Cup playoffs, on April 21, he scored the latest regulation game-winning goal in NHL playoff history, with 0.2 seconds remaining in the third period, as the Hurricanes defeated the New Jersey Devils 4–3 in Game 4 of the Eastern Conference Quarter-finals.

On June 29, 2009, the Hurricanes signed Jokinen to a two-year, $3.4 million contract ($1.5 million in 2009–10 and $1.9 million in 2010–11). As of November 19, 2009, Jokinen had scored a total of 25 goals in 46 shootout attempts, with an impressive 54.3% success rate. Eight of those shootout goals were game-winners.

Jokinen re-signed with his former Finnish club Kärpät during the 2012–13 NHL lockout and committed himself to remain with the club until the resumption of the NHL season in January 2013.

Pittsburgh Penguins
On March 26, 2013, Jokinen was placed on waivers by Hurricanes. On April 3, 2013, Jokinen was traded to the Pittsburgh Penguins in exchange for a conditional sixth- or seventh-round pick in 2013. In his first game with the Penguins, Jokinen scored Pittsburgh's lone goal in regulation and tallied the only shootout goal for the team in a 2–1 victory over the New York Rangers. During the 2013–14 season, on October 8, 2013, Jokinen scored his first hat-trick with the Penguins in a 5–2 win over his former team, the Carolina Hurricanes. Jokinen enjoyed his most productive season since 2010, totaling 21 goals and 57 points in 81 games with the Penguins, playing alongside Evgeni Malkin for most of the season.

Florida Panthers
On July 1, 2014, as an unrestricted free agent, Jokinen signed a four-year, $16 million contract with the Florida Panthers. During his second season with the club, Jokinen scored 18 goals and 60 points, the second-best offensive output of his career. During six playoff games, Jokinen contributed one goal and three assists.

Edmonton Oilers and Los Angeles Kings
On June 30, 2017, following the 2016–17 season and with one-year remaining on his contract, Jokinen was bought-out by the Panthers. On July 7, 2017, as a free agent, Jokinen signed a one-year, $1.1 million contract with the Edmonton Oilers. In the 2017–18 season, he struggled to find his role with Edmonton, adding just 1 assist in 14 games. On November 14, 2017, he was traded to the Los Angeles Kings in exchange for Mike Cammalleri. Jokinen recorded 1 goal and 4 assists in 18 games for the club.

Columbus Blue Jackets and Vancouver Canucks
On January 16, 2018, Jokinen was placed on waivers by the Kings, and was then claimed off waivers by the Columbus Blue Jackets on January 17. On February 26, 2018, Jokinen and Tyler Motte were traded to the Vancouver Canucks in exchange for Thomas Vanek. As a result of this trade, Jokinen became the fourth player in NHL history, behind Dennis O'Brien, Dave McLlwain and Mark Arcobello, to play for four different NHL teams in a single season. He also joins the exclusive club of scoring at least a point in each of the four different hockey clubs he played for in one NHL season, along with O'Brien and Arcobello.

Return to Europe
Having completed his NHL career, Jokinen returned to Europe in signing with EHC Kloten of the Swiss League. He registered 12 points through just 7 games before returning to his original Finnish club, Oulun Kärpät.

After three further seasons in the Liiga, Jokinen announced his retirement on 18 May 2021, ending a career spanning 20 seasons.

International play

Jokinen has played for the Finnish national team in multiple tournaments, including the 2006 and 2014 Winter Olympics, winning a silver and bronze medal.

In 2016, Jokinen and teammate Aleksander Barkov Jr. were selected to represent Team Finland at the 2016 IIHF World Championship. They won silver after a 2–0 loss to Team Canada.

Career statistics

Regular season and playoffs

International

References

External links
 

1983 births
Carolina Hurricanes players
Columbus Blue Jackets players
Dallas Stars draft picks
Dallas Stars players
Edmonton Oilers players
Finnish expatriate ice hockey players in the United States
Finnish ice hockey left wingers
Florida Panthers players
Ice hockey players at the 2006 Winter Olympics
Ice hockey players at the 2014 Winter Olympics
EHC Kloten players
Living people
Los Angeles Kings players
Medalists at the 2006 Winter Olympics
Medalists at the 2014 Winter Olympics
Olympic bronze medalists for Finland
Olympic ice hockey players of Finland
Olympic medalists in ice hockey
Olympic silver medalists for Finland
Oulun Kärpät players
People from Kalajoki
Pittsburgh Penguins players
Tampa Bay Lightning players
Vancouver Canucks players
Sportspeople from North Ostrobothnia